Tingena letharga is a species of moth in the family Oecophoridae. It is endemic to New Zealand and has been observed in Otago. Adults are on the wing in December and January.

Taxonomy
This species was first described by Edward Meyrick in 1883 using specimens collected in Dunedin in January. Meyrick originally named the species Oecophora horaea. Meyrick went on to give a fuller description of the species in 1884. In 1915 Meyrick placed this species within the Borkhausenia genus. In 1926 Alfred Philpott was unable to study the genitalia of the male of this species as it was not represented in collections in New Zealand.  George Hudson discussed this species under the name Borkhausenia letharga in his 1928 publication The butterflies and moths of New Zealand. In 1988 J. S. Dugdale placed this species in the genus Tingena. The male lectotype specimen is held at the Natural History Museum, London.

Description 

Meyrick first described this species as follows:

Meyrick described this species more fully as follows:

Distribution 
This species is endemic to New Zealand and has been observed in Otago including at Dunedin and Ida Valley.

Behaviour 
Adults of this species are on the wing in December and January.

References

Oecophoridae
Moths of New Zealand
Moths described in 1883
Endemic fauna of New Zealand
Taxa named by Edward Meyrick
Endemic moths of New Zealand